James Tierney may refer to:

 James Tierney (attorney) (born 1947), legal scholar and former Maine Attorney General
 James Tierney (footballer) (1878–1959), Australian rules footballer
 Jim Tierney (footballer) (born 1940), Scottish footballer
 Cotton Tierney (James Arthur Tierney, 1894–1953), American baseball player

See also